David Kjær Kruse (born 15 May 2002) is a Danish professional footballer who plays as a midfielder for Danish 1st Division club AC Horsens.

Career

Horsens
Kruse started playing football at Sole IF, where he played for 4,5-years. He later joined Hedensted IF, where he was for 1,5-years, before joining AC Horsens as a U13 player. In August 2019, after a good season with the U17s, games for the reserve team and training with the first team, 17-year old Kruse signed a contract with Horsens until June 2022.

Shortly after, on 4 September 2019, Kruse got his official debut for Horsens in a Danish Cup game against BK Union. This was his only official first team appearance in the 2019–20 season.

In September 2020 Horsens confirmed, that 18-year old Kruse had been permanently promoted to the first team squad. After two Danish Cup appearances in beginning of the 2020–21 season, Kruse got his Danish Superliga debut for Horsens on 11 April 2021 against SønderjyskE. He made a total of five appearances in the Superliga, before he signed a contract extension at the end of the season, until June 2025.

References

External links

2002 births
Living people
Danish men's footballers
Association football midfielders
Danish Superliga players
Danish 1st Division players
AC Horsens players